St-Rémi-de-Napierville Cemetery is a small Catholic cemetery in Saint-Rémi-de-Napierville, Quebec and located on the southside of rue Saint-André east of rue Saint-Paul (232 rue Saint-André).

It is the final resting place of 15th Canadian Prime Minister Pierre Elliott Trudeau (1919–2000) – in the family mausoleum that can be seen from the rue Saint-André.) During the night of April 24–25, 2008, the Trudeau family mausoleum was defaced with "FLQ" and the French word for "traitor" written in spray-paint.

See also
 St. Thomas Aquinas Cemetery, burial place of Louis St. Laurent in Compton, Quebec
 Maclaren Cemetery, burial place of Lester B. Pearson in Wakefield, Quebec

References

External links
 
 Location of cemetery on Google map
 Prime Minister Trudeau and his then-wife Margaret attend burial of his mother (born Grace Elliott) on January 18, 1973

Cemeteries in Quebec
Roman Catholic cemeteries in Canada